The 2018–19 season was the 69th season in the existence of Stade Brestois 29 and the club's sixth consecutive season in the second division of French football. In addition to the domestic league, Brest participated in this season's editions of the Coupe de France and the Coupe de la Ligue.

Players

First-team squad

Out on loan

Competitions

Overview

Ligue 2

League table

Results summary

Results by round

Matches
The league fixtures were announced on 7 June 2018.

Coupe de France

Coupe de la Ligue

Statistics

Goalscorers

References

Stade Brestois 29 seasons
Brest